The International Council for Industrial and Applied Mathematics (ICIAM) is an organisation for professional applied mathematics societies and related organisations. The current (2020) President is Ya-xiang Yuan.

History
Until 1999 the Council was known as the Committee for International Conferences on Industrial and Applied Mathematics (CICIAM). Formed in 1987 with the start of the ICIAM conference series, this committee represented the leaders of four applied mathematics societies: the Gesellschaft für Angewandte Mathematik und Mechanik (GAMM), in Germany, the Institute of Mathematics and its Applications (IMA), in England, the Society for Industrial and Applied Mathematics (SIAM), in the USA, and the Société de Mathématiques Appliquées et Industrielles (SMAI), in France. The first two presidents of the council, Roger Temam and Reinhard Mennicken, oversaw the addition of several other societies as members and associate members of the council; as of 2015 it had 21 full members and 26 associate members. Past Presidents include Olavi Nevanlinna, Ian Sloan, Rolf Jeltsch, Barbara Keyfitz, and María J. Esteban.

Congress
ICIAM organizes the four-yearly International Congress on Industrial and Applied Mathematics, the first of which was held in 1987. The most recent congress was in 2019 in Valencia (Spain), and the next will be in 2023 in Tokyo (Japan). It also sponsors several prizes, awarded at the congresses: the Lagrange Prize for exceptional career contributions, the Collatz Prize for outstanding applied mathematicians under the age of 42, the Pioneer Prize for applied mathematical work in a new field, the Maxwell Prize for originality in applied mathematics, and the Su Buchin Prize for outstanding contributions to emerging economies and human development.

Collatz Prize
The Collatz Prize is awarded by ICIAM every four years at the International Congress on Industrial and Applied Mathematics, to an applied mathematician under the age of 42. It was established in 1999 on the initiative of Gesellschaft für Angewandte Mathematik und Mechanik (GAMM), to recognize outstanding contributions in applied and industrial mathematics.

Named after the German mathematician Lothar Collatz, it is widely regarded as one of the most prestigious prizes for young applied mathematicians.

Prize Winners
 1999 Stefan Müller
 2003 E Weinan
 2007 Felix Otto
 2011 Emmanuel Candès
 2015 Annalisa Buffa
 2019 Siddhartha Mishra

Lagrange Prize
The Lagrange Prize is awarded by ICIAM every four years at the International Congress on Industrial and Applied Mathematics, for lifetime achievement in applied mathematics. Named after Joseph-Louis Lagrange, it was established in 1999 on the initiative of Société de Mathématiques Appliquées et Industrielles (SMAI), Sociedad Española de Matemática Aplicada (SEMA) and Società Italiana di Matematica Applicata e Industriale (SIMAI).

Prize Winners
 1999 Jacques-Louis Lions
 2003 
 2007 Joseph Keller
 2011 Alexandre Chorin
 2015 Andrew Majda
 2019 George C. Papanicolaou

Maxwell Prize
The Maxwell Prize is awarded by ICIAM every four years at the International Congress on Industrial and Applied Mathematics. Established in 1999 and named after James Clerk Maxwell, the prize provides international recognition to a mathematician who has demonstrated originality in applied mathematics. It was created on the initiative of the Institute of Mathematics and its Applications with the support of the James Clerk Maxwell Foundation.

Prize Winners
 1999 Grigory Barenblatt
 2003 Martin David Kruskal
 2007 
 2011 Vladimir Rokhlin
 2015 Jean-Michel Coron
 2019 Claude Bardos

Pioneer Prize
The Pioneer Prize is awarded by ICIAM every four years at the International Congress on Industrial and Applied Mathematics, for pioneering applied mathematical work in a new field. It was established in 1999 on the initiative of the Society for Industrial and Applied Mathematics (SIAM).

Prize Winners
 1999 Ronald Coifman and 
 2003 Stanley Osher
 2007 Ingrid Daubechies and Heinz Engl
 2011 James Albert Sethian
 2015 Björn Engquist
 2019 Yvon Maday

Su Buchin Prize
The Su Buchin Prize is awarded by ICIAM every four years at the International Congress on Industrial and Applied Mathematics. Established in 2003 and named after the Chinese mathematician Su Buchin, the prize provides international recognition to outstanding contributions to applying mathematics to emerging economies and human development, including improving teaching and research. It was created on the initiative of the China Society for Industrial and Applied Mathematics (CSIAM), and was first awarded in 2007.

Prize Winners
 2007 Gilbert Strang
 2011 Edward Lungu
 2015 
 2019 Giulia Di Nunno

Olga Taussky-Todd Lecture
An Olga Taussky-Todd Lecture has been held at each International Congress on Industrial and Applied Mathematics since 2007. Named after Olga Taussky-Todd, the lectureship is conferred upon an outstanding woman applied mathematician.

Olga Taussky-Todd Lecturers
 2007 Pauline van den Driessche
 2011 Beatrice Pelloni
 2015 Éva Tardos
 2019 Françoise Tisseur

References

External links
 Official web site

Mathematical societies
Applied mathematics
Members of the International Science Council